Michael Meeks (born February 23, 1972) is a Canadian former professional basketball player. Meeks is currently working for Canada Basketball. He is a former member of the Canadian national men's basketball team.

College career 
A 6'9", 235 lb. centre-power forward, Meeks led Canisius College in his senior year in 1996 to the school's only NCAA Tournament appearance since the mid-1950s. They lost badly in the first round, however, to the Utah Utes. He finished his four-year career as the school's second all-time scorer and rebounder and was inducted in the Hall of Fame in January 2007.

National team career 
Meeks played for Canada in the 2000 Summer Olympics and was central to the team winning their preliminary round group leading the team in scoring. (They lost in the quarter-finals however and finished 7th.) He also competed in two world championships, 1998 and 2002.

Personal 
Meeks is a dual citizen, having acquired German citizenship whilst playing there. He is a native of Brampton, Ontario, having settled there as a youth after immigrating to Canada from Jamaica.

After returning to Canada, he was named manager of youth player development at Canada Basketball in 2015.

References 

 
 

1972 births
Living people
ABA League players
Basketball players at the 2000 Summer Olympics
BC UNICS players
BG Göttingen players
Besançon BCD players
Black Canadian basketball players
Bree BBC players
Canadian expatriate basketball people in Belgium
Canadian expatriate basketball people in Croatia
Canadian expatriate basketball people in France
Canadian expatriate basketball people in Germany
Canadian expatriate basketball people in Italy
Canadian expatriate basketball people in Russia
Canadian expatriate basketball people in Turkey
Canadian expatriate basketball people in the United States
Canadian expatriate basketball people in the Czech Republic
Canadian men's basketball players
Canisius Golden Griffins men's basketball players
Centers (basketball)
Basketball Nymburk players
Darüşşafaka Basketbol players
Fabriano Basket players
German expatriate basketball people in Belgium
German expatriate sportspeople in Croatia
German expatriate basketball people in France
German expatriate basketball people in Russia
German expatriate sportspeople in the Czech Republic
German men's basketball players
German people of Canadian descent
German people of Jamaican descent
Jamaican emigrants to Canada
KK Zadar players
Naturalized citizens of Canada
Naturalized citizens of Germany
Olympic basketball players of Canada
Pan American Games competitors for Canada
Power forwards (basketball)
Sportspeople from Brampton
Sportspeople from Kingston, Jamaica
Telekom Baskets Bonn players
Viola Reggio Calabria players
1998 FIBA World Championship players
2002 FIBA World Championship players